The 1990–91 daytime network television schedule for the four major English-language commercial broadcast networks in the United States covers the weekday and weekend daytime hours from September 1990 to August 1991.

Legend

 New series are highlighted in bold.

Schedule
 All times correspond to U.S. Eastern and Pacific Time scheduling (except for some live sports or events). Except where affiliates slot certain programs outside their network-dictated timeslots, subtract one hour for Central, Mountain, Alaska, and Hawaii-Aleutian times.
 Local schedules may differ, as affiliates have the option to pre-empt or delay network programs. Such scheduling may be limited to preemptions caused by local or national breaking news or weather coverage (which may force stations to tape delay certain programs in overnight timeslots or defer them to a co-operated station or digital subchannel in their regular timeslot) and any major sports events scheduled to air in a weekday timeslot (mainly during major holidays). Stations may air shows at other times at their preference.

Monday–Friday

NBC note: Wheel of Fortune aired its last daytime episode on September 20, 1991. The following Monday, NBC returned the 10:00 AM hour to its affiliates.

Saturday

Several Fox stations aired WWF Superstars of Wrestling and/or WWF Wrestling Challenge after the Fox Children's Network block.

Sunday

By network

ABC

Returning series:
ABC Weekend Special
ABC World News This Morning
ABC World News Tonight with Peter Jennings
All My Children
Beetlejuice
The Bugs Bunny and Tweety Show
General Hospital
Good Morning America
Home
Loving
Match Game
The New Adventures of Winnie the Pooh
One Life to Live
A Pup Named Scooby-Doo
Slimer! and the Real Ghostbusters
This Week with David Brinkley

New series:
Little Rosey
New Kids on the Block
The Wizard of Oz

Not returning from 1989-90:
Adventures of the Gummi Bears
Animal Crack-Ups
The Flintstone Kids 
Perfect Strangers

CBS

Returning series:
The Adventures of Raggedy Ann and Andy 
As the World Turns
The Bold and the Beautiful
CBS Evening News
CBS Morning News
CBS News Sunday Morning
CBS Storybreak 
CBS This Morning
Dink, the Little Dinosaur
Face the Nation
Family Feud
Garfield and Friends
Guiding Light
Jim Henson's Muppet Babies
Pee-wee's Playhouse
The Price Is Right
Teenage Mutant Ninja Turtles
Wheel of Fortune
The Young and the Restless

New series:
The Barbara DeAngelis Show
Bill & Ted's Excellent Adventures
Designing Women 
Soap Star Family Feud

Not returning from 1989-90:
The California Raisins Show
Dungeons & Dragons
Rude Dog and the Dweebs

Fox

New series:
Attack of the Killer Tomatoes
Bobby's World
Fun House
Fox's Peter Pan & the Pirates
Piggsburg Pigs
Swamp Thing
Tom & Jerry Kids Show
Zazoo U

NBC

Returning series:
Another World
Camp Candy
Captain N: The Game Master
The Chipmunks Go to the Movies
Classic Concentration
Days of Our Lives
Generations
Let's Make a Deal
The Marsha Warfield Show
Meet the Press
NBC News at Sunrise
NBC Nightly News with Tom Brokaw
Santa Barbara
Saved by the Bell
Today
Wheel of Fortune

New series:
The Adventures of Super Mario Bros. 3
A Closer Look/The Faith Daniels Show
Cover to Cover
Full House 
Gravedale High
Guys Next Door
Kid 'n Play
NBA Inside Stuff
Roomies 
Saturday Morning Videos
To Tell the Truth
TrialWatch

Not returning from 1989-90:
ALF 
ALF Tales
The Golden Girls 
The Karate Kid
Kissyfur 
Scrabble
The Smurfs

See also
1990-91 United States network television schedule (prime-time)
1990-91 United States network television schedule (late night)

Sources
https://web.archive.org/web/20071015122215/http://curtalliaume.com/abc_day.html
https://web.archive.org/web/20071015122235/http://curtalliaume.com/cbs_day.html
https://web.archive.org/web/20071012211242/http://curtalliaume.com/nbc_day.html

United States weekday network television schedules
1990 in American television
1991 in American television